Jatt James Bond or JJB is a 2014 Indian Punjabi film directed by Rohit Jugraj, and starring Gippy Grewal and Zareen Khan as leads, along with Gurpreet Ghuggi, Yashpal Sharma. The music of the film is given by Jatinder Shah and Mukhtar Sahota.

The film marks the Punjabi cinema debut of Bollywood actress Zareen Khan in her first Punjabi film. It was released on 26 April 2014.

Plot

Shinda (Gippy Grewal) was mistreated by his relatives, so he finds other ways to have his love Laali (Zarine Khan). Shinda and his two other friends come up with a plan to solve all of their problems. They decide to rob the local bank in an attempt to become rich.

Cast
 Gippy Grewal as Sukhshindar Singh a.k.a. Shinda
 Zareen Khan as Laaly
 Gurpreet Ghuggi as Binder
 Yashpal Sharma as Bant Mistri
 Rubina as Bank Employee
 Mukesh Rishi as MLA
 Vindu Dara Singh as Bank Manager and Laaly's Brother
 Avtar Gill as Sarpanch
 Sardar Sohi as Jarnail
 Shahbaz Khan as INS Harnek Singh
 Karamjit Anmol as Sucha Singh

Production
In August 2013, the principal cast including Zarine Khan was announced. The film is being produced by Gurdeep Dhillon under Fortune House Productions Inc. Subsequently, two songs performed by Rahat Fateh Ali Khan with lyrics by S M Sadiq were recorded. Music Director Mukhtar Sahota has also done two songs for the film featuring Arif Lohar & Rahat Fateh Ali Khan. The film went into principal photography in late October 2013.

Release
The first poster of the film was released in January 2014, ahead of its release on 25 April 2014. The movie opened well across Punjab and collect more than 55 million in first 2 days of the release.

Soundtrack

Accolades

Jatt James Bond won eight awards at the PTC Punjabi Film Awards in 2015.

References

External links
 Jatt james Bond on Facebook
 

2014 films
Films directed by Rohit Jugraj Chauhan
Films scored by Jatinder Shah
Films scored by Mukhtar Sahota
Punjabi-language Indian films
2010s Punjabi-language films